Emosi 'Moose' Koloto is a New Zealand former rugby league and rugby union footballer. He represented the New Zealand national rugby league team 5 times during 1991.

Early years
Koloto grew up in Manawatu and attended Palmerston North Boys' High School.

Rugby Union
Koloto was selected for the New Zealand national schoolboy rugby union team in 1983.  He then representing Manawatu from 1984 to 1986.  He played for New Zealand Universities in 1985 and then in 1996 he was selected to represent Tonga in rugby union.

Koloto moved to Wellington for the 1987 season, scoring two tries on his debut.

Rugby League
Koloto then switched codes to rugby league, signing with the Doug Laughton-coached Widnes. Laughton spotted Koloto when he played for Wellington against Wales in 1988.

Emosi Koloto played right-, i.e. number 12, in Widnes' 24–18 victory over Salford in the 1990 Lancashire County Cup Final during the 1990–91 season at Central Park, Wigan on Saturday 29 September 1990.

Emosi Koloto played right-, i.e. number 12, (replaced by interchange/substitute Paul Hulme) in Widnes' 6–12 defeat by Wigan in the 1988–89 John Player Special Trophy Final during the 1988–89 season at Burnden Park, Bolton on Saturday 7 January 1989.

In 1991 he made the New Zealand national rugby league team, playing in five tests including the three test series against Australia where he started in the second row in all three tests. He agreed to terms with Manly for 1991 but was drafted by North Sydney, and, like Terry Hill but in contrast to Ron Gibbs, his appeal was turned down on 26 April 1991 and Koloto refused to play in Sydney.

Return to New Zealand
After returning to New Zealand Koloto has resided in Auckland.  He coached the Papatoetoe Rugby club.

He is now an accountant.

His daughter Vika Koloto is a netballer who has played for the Northern Stars.

His nephew Fred Koloto is an Offensive Tackle at San Jose State.

External Links
 Emosi Koloto | Rugby Database Profile

References

New Zealand rugby league players
New Zealand rugby union players
Tongan rugby union players
New Zealand national rugby league team players
Dual-code rugby internationals
Widnes Vikings players
New Zealand accountants
Living people
People educated at Palmerston North Boys' High School
Tonga international rugby union players
Wellington rugby league team players
Wainuiomata Lions players
1965 births
Tongan emigrants to New Zealand
People from Nukuʻalofa
Rugby league second-rows